The Douglas and Charlotte Grant House is a historic building located in Marion, Iowa, United States. This is one of the first houses in Iowa built in this style, having been completed a year after the Lowell E. Walter House located near Quasqueton. The two houses are very similar in style. The characteristics that mark this as a Wright-designed house include: the house integrated into the site and opened to the outdoors; the use of window walls and horizontal bands of windows; natural lighting and ventilation; use of natural materials; a horizontal emphasis in mass and proportion; a car port in place of a garage; slab-on-grade construction with radiant heat system embedded in the slab; a flat roof; an open-plan interior; varied ceiling heights on the interior; built-in
furniture; and a large scale fireplace with a central hearth.  The limestone for the house was quarried on the property.  The house was listed on the National Register of Historic Places in 1988.

References

 Storrer, William Allin. The Frank Lloyd Wright Companion. University Of Chicago Press, 2006,  (S.288)

External links

Photos on Arcaid
Grant house on waymarking.com

Houses completed in 1951
Modernist architecture in Iowa
Houses in Marion, Iowa
National Register of Historic Places in Linn County, Iowa
Houses on the National Register of Historic Places in Iowa
Frank Lloyd Wright buildings